Robert Lewis Byington (January 29, 1820 – June 20, 1886) was a Democratic politician who served on the Sierra County Board of Supervisors (1867–1870) and (1875–1877), and California State Assembly, 24th District (1877–1878). Byington was one of the early pioneers of Sierra County, California. He was baptized as Robert Lewis Byington on August 27, 1820, by Rev. Heman R. Timlow.

Early life
Byington was born in Southington, Harford County, Connecticut on June 29, 1820. He was a son of Zebulon and Abigail Webster, a cousin of Daniel Webster. An early paternal American ancestor was William Byington who came with his wife Elizabeth Jackson from Yorkshire, England in 1638 and settled in the following year at Rowley, Massachusetts.

The family moved to Cincinnati, Ohio, where he was raised and attended public school. Byington left Cincinnati and went by ship to California around Cape Horn, reaching San Francisco on April 29, 1852. Seeking the discovery of gold in California, he moved to the mining district in the Sierra Nevada mountains, going first to Dutch Flat and then to Goodyears Bar and Monte Cristo in Sierra county.

On November 23, 1857, Byington married Catherine Alice Freehill at Forest City, Sierra County, California. She is the daughter of Francis Freehill, a native of Ireland. They had eight children: William Henry; Mary (died in childhood); Mary Emma, wife of Tirey Lafayette Ford; Lewis Francis; Charles Thomas; Catherine Lydia; Clara Mary; and Francis Joseph Byington. The 1870 U.S. Census lists Lewis Byington (49), Catherine (35), William H. (10), Mary E. (7), Lewis F. (2), Charles T. Byington (1).

In 1862 Byington settled at Downieville, Sierra county. He was a butcher by trade and made a living in mining and stock raising and owned farm land in Colusa County, California.

Professional life
Byington was a Democrat. He was first elected Sheriff of Sierra county. During 1867–1870 and 1875–1877 he was a member of the Board of Supervisors of Sierra county.

In 1877–1878 he was a member of the California State Assembly for Sierra County. At age 59, he was registered to vote on April 15, 1879, in Downieville, Sierra, California.

Death
He died in San Francisco, California on June 30, 1886. He was 66 years old. He was buried at the Downieville Cemetery in Downieville, California.

References

External links

1820 births
1886 deaths
People from Downieville, California
Members of the California State Assembly
19th-century American politicians